White Noise is a 2022 absurdist comedy-drama film, written and directed by Noah Baumbach, adapted from the 1985 novel with the same title by Don DeLillo. It is Baumbach's first directed feature not to be based on an original story of his own. The film stars Adam Driver, Greta Gerwig, Don Cheadle, Raffey Cassidy, Sam Nivola, and May Nivola. Set in the 1980s, the story follows the life of an academic and his family whose lives change after an air contamination accident near their home.

White Noise had its world premiere at the 79th Venice International Film Festival on August 31, 2022, and was released in select cinemas on November 25, 2022, before its streaming release on December 30, by Netflix. The film received generally positive reviews from critics, with Baumbach's direction, cinematography, cast performances (particularly Driver's), and Danny Elfman's score receiving praise, although the film's screenplay, varying tones, and length divided many.

Plot
In 1984, Jack Gladney is a professor of "Hitler studies" (a field he founded) at the College-on-the-Hill in Ohio. Despite his specialism, he speaks no German and is secretly taking basic lessons to prepare for a speech he is due to give at a conference. Jack is married to Babette, his fourth wife. Together, they raise a blended family with four children: Heinrich and Steffie, from two of Jack's previous marriages; Denise, from Babette's previous marriage; and Wilder, a child they conceived together. Denise spies on Babette and finds her secret prescription stash of Dylar, a mysterious drug not in the usual records. Jack experiences a dream about a mysterious man trying to kill him, alluding to an earlier conversation with Babette focused on their mutual fear of death. Jack's colleague, Murray Siskind, a professor of American culture, wishes to develop a similarly niche field, "Elvis studies,” and convinces Jack to help him. They briefly become rivals as competition between their courses arises.

However, their lives are disrupted when a cataclysmic train accident casts a cloud of chemical waste over the town. This "Airborne Toxic Event" forces a massive evacuation, which leads to a major traffic jam on the highway. Jack drives to a gas station to refill his car, where he is inadvertently exposed to the cloud. The family and numerous others are forced into quarantine at a summer camp. Murray supplies Jack with a small palm-sized pistol to protect himself against the more dangerous survivalists in the camp. One day, chaos ensues when multiple families desperately try to escape the camp. The Gladneys almost make it out but ultimately end up with their car floating in the river. They later arrive in Iron City, where they encounter a man who rants about the lack of media attention on the evacuees and spots Jack, claiming he had seen him before looking at him. After nine days, the family manages to return home. However, since Jack was briefly exposed to the chemical waste, his fear of death becomes exacerbated.

Later, everything has returned to normal except for Babette, who has become pale, lethargic and emotionally distant from Jack and the rest of the family. Soon afterward, Jack begins having hallucinations of a mysterious, balding man following him around. Denise shares her concerns regarding Dylar and Jack confronts Babette. She admits to having joined a shadowy clinical trial for a drug to treat death anxieties, and when she was cut from the trial, agreed to having sex with "Mr. Gray" in exchange for a continuing supply of the drug. Intrigued by the idea, Jack asks Denise for the Dylar bottle, but she reveals she threw it away earlier. While digging through the garbage, Jack finds a newspaper ad for Dylar, prompting him to retrieve his pistol and get revenge on Mr. Gray. Jack tracks him down at a motel, where he discovers that Mr. Gray was the man in his hallucinations. Jack shoots him and places the gun in his hand so as to make it look like suicide. Babette unexpectedly shows up and sees a still-alive Mr. Gray, who manages to shoot them both. After Jack and Babette convince the confused Mr. Gray that he is responsible for their injuries, they take him to a nearby hospital run by German atheist nuns. There, the couple also reconcile with each other.

The next day, the Gladneys shop at an A&P supermarket, where the family participates in a dance number with all the other patrons and employees.

Cast

Production

Development
On July 28, 2004, Barry Sonnenfeld was set to direct the film adaptation of White Noise from a script by Stephen Schiff. In 2016, Uri Singer acquired the rights to the book and pushed the project into development. On October 17, 2016, Michael Almereyda was set to write and direct the film adaptation. On January 13, 2021, it was revealed that Noah Baumbach would be adapting and directing the film for Netflix producing alongside David Heyman and Uri Singer.

Casting
On December 22, 2020, Adam Driver and Greta Gerwig were cast in the film. In April 2021, Raffey Cassidy, May Nivola and Sam Nivola joined the cast of the film. In June 2021, Jodie Turner-Smith entered negotiations to join the cast. She would confirm her involvement the next month, as well as revealing Don Cheadle would star as well. In August 2021, it was announced André Benjamin had joined the cast of the film.

Filming
Principal photography began in June 2021, under the working title Wheat Germ. Filming took place in Ohio, including the University of Akron for approximately six weeks, Ashtabula Pine Lake Raceway and Trail Riding, Cleveland Heights, The College of Wooster, Wellington, Oberlin, Dorset, Hiram College,  Andrews Osborne Academy in Willoughby, Kent State University, in Lowell Klienfelter Stadium on the campus of Canton Central Catholic High School in Stark County Ohio and in Perry Township, near Salem.

Filming took place in downtown Cleveland on November 4, 2021, with scenes shot on the Hope Memorial Bridge.

Music 

The film score is composed by Danny Elfman, which was released into a soundtrack album on November 18, 2022. LCD Soundsystem reunited to record their first new music in over five years for the film. Titled "New Body Rhumba", the song was released as a single on September 30.

Release
White Noise had its world premiere as the opening film of the 79th Venice International Film Festival on August 31, 2022, and also served as the opening film for the 2022 New York Film Festival on September 30. It also screened at the 31st Philadelphia Film Festival in October 2022. The film was theatrically released in the United States by Netflix on November 25, 2022, before its streaming release on December 30.

Reception
On the review aggregator website Rotten Tomatoes, White Noise holds a rating of 63% based on 245 reviews, with an average rating of 6.4/10. The site's critics consensus reads: "White Noise may occasionally struggle with its allegedly unfilmable source material, but Noah Baumbach succeeds in finding the humorous heart of its surprisingly timely story." On Metacritic, which uses a weighted average, the film has a score of 66 out of 100, based on 45 critics, indicating "generally favorable" reviews.

Reviewing the film following its Venice Film Festival premiere, Peter Bradshaw of The Guardian gave the film five out of five stars, writing, "Baumbach has landed a sizeable white whale in his tremendously elegant and assured adaptation." The Hollywood Reporter’s David Rooney described it as "Equal parts clear signal and wearying static", praising the cast performances, humor, and score, but finding the screenplay inconsistent. David Ehrlich of IndieWire called the adaptation "equal parts inspired and exasperating".

Accolades

See also
 Postmodernist film
 Postmodernist literature
 2023 Ohio train derailment

References

External links
 White Noise on Netflix
 
 Official screenplay

2022 films
2022 black comedy films
American black comedy films
British black comedy films
English-language Netflix original films
Films about consumerism
Films based on American novels
Films directed by Noah Baumbach
Films produced by David Heyman
Films scored by Danny Elfman
Films set in 1984
Films shot in Ohio
Heyday Films films
A24 (company) films
Rail transport films
2020s English-language films
Films about academia
2020s American films
2020s British films
Postmodern films
Absurdist fiction
2020s disaster films